White Hollow is a valley in Iron County in the U.S. state of Missouri.

White Hollow has the name of the local White family.

References

Valleys of Iron County, Missouri
Valleys of Missouri